Shek Lei North, formerly called Shek Lei, is one of the 31 constituencies in the Kwai Tsing District in Hong Kong.

The constituency returns one district councillor to the Kwai Tsing District Council, with an election every four years. The seat has been currently held by Lam Siu-fai of the Democratic Party.

Wai Ying constituency is loosely based on Shek Lei Estate in Kwai Chung with an estimated population of 15,253.

Councillors represented

Election results

2010s

2000s

1990s

References

Kwai Chung
Constituencies of Hong Kong
Constituencies of Kwai Tsing District Council
1991 establishments in Hong Kong
Constituencies established in 1991